Formula Acceleration 1 (FA1) was a single make, open wheel auto racing series. It was unusual in its field in that competitors solely represented their nation as opposed to themselves or a team, the usual format in most formula racing series.

FA1 was created in 2014 as the signature category in the Acceleration 2014 series of motorsport festivals. Rather than developing their own car, the series reduced costs substantially by using the Lola B05/52 which was used in the early years of the A1 Grand Prix series. They also continued to use the same 3.4 litre V8 engine built by Zytek Engineering. On 22 December 2014, it was announced that the series would be merged with Auto GP in 2015. This to ensure that at least 18 cars will participate in each race. It was also announced that the 2015 champion will be granted a Formula 1 test. However, the season was halted after two rounds due to the lack of entrants.

Technical specifications
All cars are mechanically identical and have been built with reducing costs in mind, which has led to an approximate price for the whole season of €450,000. FA1 will use the Lola B05/52, used in the A1 Grand Prix between 2005 and 2008.

Engine: 3.4 litre Zytek ZA1348 V8
Horsepower: 550 hp
Chassis: carbon fibre and aluminium honeycomb
Wheelbase: 3,000 mm (118.1 in)
Weight: 698 kg (driver included)
Suspension: double wishbone suspension with push-rod
Dampers: Öhlins TT44 3-Way, adjustable
Gearbox: Xtrac, electronic, six gears
Brakes: AP calipers with four pistons, steel discs
Tyres: Michelin

Champion

References

External links
 

Acceleration (festival)
European auto racing series
One-make series
Formula racing series
Recurring events established in 2014
Recurring events disestablished in 2014
Defunct auto racing series